Sanjeev K Jha (born 1988) is an Indian screenwriter based in Mumbai. He started his career as a freelance journalist and worked with The Indian Express, Jansatta, Hindustan HT Media, Dainik Jagran and Outlook.

His first Hindi feature as Story & Screenplay writer Jabariya Jodi is produced by Ekta Kapoor, Shobha Kapoor & Shailesh R Singh starring Sidharth Malhotra and Parineeti Chopra.

In June 2019, Jabariya Jodi screenwriter Sanjeev K Jha has signed a digital film Barot House with ZEE5 starring Amit Sadh and Manjari Fadnis. Barot House  is a dark, gripping story inspired by true events, released worldwide by ZEE5 on 7 August 2019 and also got nominated in 2020 Filmfare OTT Awards.Currently he is developing web series on the life of Aditya Verma who fought legal battle with BCCI for 18 years against Bihar cricket ban.

In the 68th National Film Awards Sanjeev's feature film Sumi bag national awards in two categories, National Film Award for Best Children's Film and National Film Award for Best Child Artist.

Early life and Background
Belonging to a nationalist & patriotic family, Sanjeev K Jha is the grandson of Ramesh Chandra Jha, an eminent nationalist poet and novelist of his times. A native of a small village in Champaran, Bihar, Sanjeev K Jha is a gold medalist from Jamia Millia Islamia in Hindi literature.

Filmography

Awards and nominations

References

External links
 
 Movie Mirchi, Delhi : Interview : 22 Feb 2019
 Sanjeev K Jha on Twitter 
 Sanjeev K Jha on Instagram 
 Sanjeev K Jha on Facebook

1988 births
Living people
Hindi screenwriters
Screenwriters from Mumbai
Writers from Mumbai
Indian screenwriters
Indian male screenwriters
21st-century Indian male writers
21st-century Indian dramatists and playwrights
Screenwriters from Bihar
People from Bihar
Jamia Millia Islamia alumni
People from Motihari
People from East Champaran district
Film directors from Bihar
21st-century Indian screenwriters